Tutul Hossain Badsha is a Bangladeshi footballer who plays as a centre back for Bashundhara Kings in the Bangladesh Premier League and also for the Bangladesh national football team.

Club statistics

Early career & european trial
Badsha joined prestigious club Abahani Limited Dhaka in 2012, at the age of 13. While still training with Dhaka Abahani Limited U16 team, Badsha started his footballing career with Khilgaon Club in the 2013–14 season playing for their youth level team and it was through playing for them that he developed into a professional football player and earned his chance to join a Bangladesh Premier League team.

On 21 July 2014, a 17 year old Badsha had a trial for Belgian First Division A club Anderlecht becoming only the second Bangladeshi player to get a trial in Europe. Although Badsha had only made a single league appearance before the trial, Bangladesh national team's head coach at the time Lodewijk de Kruif and assistant coach Rene Koster made the arrangements possible after Badsha caught the attention of the Dutch coaches during the 2014 AFC U-19 Championship qualifiers.

Dhaka Abahani Limited
After joining Abahani in 2012, Badsha made his first appearance during the 2013–14 season by coming on as a substitute, however, he was not a regular face in the team, due to there being more experienced defenders at his position at the time. Badsha, finally got a few appearances after veteran defenders Atiqur Rahman Meshu & Mohammed Ariful Islam parted ways with the club.

In the 2017–18 season, Badhsa became a regular for Abahani in defense due to his good performances while partnering veteran center back and former Bangladesh national team captain, Nasiruddin Chowdhury, the same season he won the  Bangladesh Premier League title with the club, making 21 league appearances during the course of the season. Badsha also created a strong defensive partnership with Afghanistan international Masih Saighani, helping Abahani become the first Bangladeshi club to reach the knockout-stages of the 2019 AFC Cup.

At the start of the 2021–222 season, he paired up with Iranian Milad Sheykh Soleimani, and kept a stern defense as Abahani won the domestic cup double. However, due to injury, Badsha could not hold onto his good form during the league campaign, as Abahani lost the championship to Bashundhara Kings.

On 6 August 2022, after continuous speculation, Badsha announced his departure from his boyhood club Abahani, through a Facebook post. He spent 10 years at the club making more than a century off appearances for Abahani in all competitions and also won all three domestic trophies along the way.

Bashundhara Kings 
In August 2022, Badsha announced Bashundhara Kings as his new destinations.

International career

Badsha made his senior debut for Bangladesh national team on 27 March 2018 against Laos in a FIFA international friendly match.

He captained the Bangladesh U23 national team during their disappointing 2022 AFC U-23 Asian Cup qualifying campaign. The team conceded a total of 10 goals during the 3 qualifying matches.

International goals

U-16 team
Scores and results list Bangladesh's goal tally first.

U-23 team
Scores and results list Bangladesh's goal tally first.

Career statistics

Club

Notes

International apps

Honours

Club
Abahani Limited
 Bangladesh Premier League: 2017–18
 Independence Cup: 2021–22
 Federation Cup: 2021–22

References

External links 
 

1999 births
Living people
Abahani Limited (Dhaka) players
Bashundhara Kings players
Bangladeshi footballers
Bangladesh international footballers
Bangladesh Football Premier League players
Association football defenders
Footballers at the 2014 Asian Games
Asian Games competitors for Bangladesh